Taan is a 2014 Indian Bengali drama film, written and directed by Mukul Roy Chowdhury. The film is based on the life of water Prostitutes and Human trafficking.

Cast
 Rituparna Sengupta as Sundari
 Debolina Dutta as Meghna
 Chandan Sen as Abed Mia
 Kaushik Sen as Ranjot
 Rajesh Sharma as Jahangir Sardar
 Sumanto Chattopadhyay as Saju
 Debdut Ghosh
 Nandini Chatterjee
 Pamela Singh Bhutoria

References

2014 films
Films about prostitution in India
Films about courtesans in India
Films about women in India
Bengali-language Indian films
2010s Bengali-language films

External links